Charles Vautin (24 June 1867 – 11 December 1942) was an Australian cricketer. He played two first-class matches for Tasmania between 1888 and 1896.

See also
 List of Tasmanian representative cricketers

References

External links
 

1867 births
1942 deaths
Australian cricketers
Tasmania cricketers
Cricketers from Tasmania